A Soldier's Sweetheart is a 1998 television film directed by Thomas Michael Donnelly and starring Kiefer Sutherland, Skeet Ulrich, and Georgina Cates. It is based on a short story by Tim O'Brien, "Sweetheart of the Song Tra Bong." The story was part of his award-winning book, The Things They Carried (1990).

Cast
 Kiefer Sutherland as Rat Kiley
 Skeet Ulrich as Mark Fossie
 Georgina Cates as Marianne Bell
 Daniel London as Eddie Diamond
 Louis Vanaria as Bobbie D
 Lawrence Gilliard, Jr. as Shoeshine
 Christopher Birt as Lt. Mitchell Sanders
 Tony Billy as Soldier #2

Release
The film is only available on VHS, and a petition has been set up at IMDb urging the companies that own the rights to the film to consider reissuing it in DVD format. It was also premiered at the Seattle International Film Festival in 1998. The film received a theatrical release in Belgium in 2010.

Reception
Bob Batz from Dayton Daily News gave A Soldier's Sweetheart a very positive review, stating: "The film, based on Tim O'Brien's award-winning short story Sweetheart of the Song Tra Bong, is a brutal, often bloody story of the Vietnam War and how it changed many of the men - and women - who were part of it. It is filled with excellent dialogue and has enough plot twists to keep viewers riveted to their easy chairs for the entire two hours."

Ken Eisner from Variety magazine also gave the film a good review, concluding: "Just when you think all the basic Vietnam stories have been told, helmer Thomas Michael Donnelly puts a new spin on America's lost cause by viewing it from a female angle. Striving for mythic levels — although there's plenty of scary grit to it — "A Soldier's Sweetheart" taps into an aspect of warfare that transcends gender. Subject, then, is a difficult one, but extremely well-mounted pic could resonate with women if Paramount can find a way to package it for theatrical release".

A Soldier's Sweetheart was nominated for two awards. One Primetime Emmy Awards for "Outstanding Sound Editing for a Miniseries, Movie or a Special" and one Golden Reel Awards for "Best Sound Editing - Television Movies of the Week - Dialogue & ADR".

References

External links 
 "The things they carried: a work of fiction, Volume 1998, Part 2" - Google Books
 
 "This 'Soldier's in a New Viet Quagmire" - Multichannel News

See also
 Unreliable narrator

1998 television films
1998 films
American television films
Vietnam War films
Films based on short fiction
Films scored by Gary Chang
1990s English-language films